John Ratcliffe (died 30 March 1633) was an English brewer and politician who sat in the House of Commons at various times between  1621 and 1629.

Ratcliffe was the son of John Ratcliffe who moved to Chester and became active in the government of the city, being mayor of Chester.

He was a brewer and became an alderman of the city, and was made mayor for 1611–12 and 1628–29. He was an ardent puritan. In 1621, he was elected Member of Parliament for City of Chester. He was elected MP for Chester again in 1628 and sat until 1629 when King Charles decided to rule without parliament for eleven years. 
 
Ratcliffe died in 1633.

Ratcliffe married as his second wife Jane Brerewood, daughter of John Brerewood of Chester. Their son John became Recorder and MP for Chester.

References

Year of birth missing
1633 deaths
Mayors of Chester
English brewers
English MPs 1621–1622
English MPs 1628–1629